KJC, or kjc, may refer to:

 the ISO 639-3 language code for Coastal Konjo
 the Library of Congress Classification code for "regional and comparative law"
 the ICAO airline designator for KrasAir
 the Kramer Junction Company, a solar power production company in California, USA
 the King James Clarified version of the Bible
 Kathmandu Jazz Conservatory
Kingdom of Jesus Christ (church)